Gorakhpur Link Expressway is an under-construction 91 km long, 4-lane wide (expandable to 6) expressway in the Indian state of Uttar Pradesh. It will connect Jaitpur village in Gorakhpur district with Salarpur village on Purvanchal Expressway in Azamgarh district. Salarpur village is situated between Dostpur and Nizamabad.

It was launched in 2018 by Chief Minister Yogi Adityanath and land acquisition was started in February 2019 by the Government of Uttar Pradesh. The total project value of Gorakhpur Link Expressway, including the land acquisition cost is around ₹ 5,876 crores.

Route
The Gorakhpur Link Expressway will connect Jaitpur village on Gorakhpur Bypass in Gorakhpur district with Salarpur village (south of Jalalpur) on Purvanchal Expressway in Azamgarh district. It will pass through 4 districts of Uttar Pradesh i.e. Gorakhpur, Sant Kabir Nagar, Ambedkar Nagar and Azamgarh.

Construction
The construction cost (excluding the cost of Land) is around ₹3,024 crores. Around  of land will be acquired for this project. 2 Toll Plaza, 3 ramp plaza, 7 Flyovers, 7 major bridges, 27 minor bridges, 16 vehicular-underpasses (VUP), 50 Light VUP and 35 pedestrian underpasses will also be constructed.

The construction work of the 91.352 km long Gorakhpur Link Expressway is divided into 2 packages:

Status updates
 Feb 2019: Land acquisition work started by Government of Uttar Pradesh.
 Oct 2019: 50% of the required land has been acquired. Construction work is divided in 2 packages.
 Nov 2019: Dilip Buildcon Ltd receives Letter of Acceptance (LoA) for Package-2 on 29 November 2019.
 Feb 2020: Construction work started on 10 February for Package-1 by Apco Infratech.
 Apr 2020: Road construction work resumed.
 Jun 2020: Construction work started on 19 June for Package-2 by Dilip Buildcon.
 Mar 2021: 1,044 out of 1,095 Hectares (95.36%) of required land has been acquired till 30 March.
 Jun 2021: 24% of construction work and 50% of earthwork is completed as of 28 June.
 Aug 2021: 27.4% of construction work completed as of 16 August, 2021.
 Nov 2021: 29% of construction work completed as of 8 November, 2021.
 Jan 2022: 50% of the earthwork and 34% of construction work has been completed.
 April 2022: As of 25 April, 39.57% of overall construction work including 65% of earthwork and 265 out of 339 structures have been completed.
 May 2022: 69% of earthwork and 45% of overall construction work has been completed. 282 structures out of 339 have been completed.
 July 2022: 71% of earthwork and 49% of overall construction work has been completed. 286 structures out of 342 have been completed.
 August 2022: 75% of earthwork and 52% of overall construction work has been completed. 289 structures out of 342 have been completed.

See also
 Purvanchal Expressway
 Agra-Lucknow Expressway
 Bundelkhand Expressway
 Ganga Expressway

External links
 Apco Infratech
 Dilip Buildcon

References

Proposed expressways in India
Expressways in Uttar Pradesh
Transport in Gorakhpur district
Proposed infrastructure in Uttar Pradesh